"Histoire/Geschichte" is a series of Franco-German history coursebooks, published since 2006. The projects aims to create a "shared vision" between French and Germans regarding the history of Europe since Antiquity. The project originated from the "Franco-German Youth Parliament" in Berlin on 21 January 2003 which gathered 500 young pupils from the French and German upper secondary school at the occasion of the 40th anniversary of the Franco-German Élysée Treaty, later taken up by German Department for Foreign Affairs and French Ministry of Education. They suggested the development of a "history coursebook having the same content in both countries so that negative preconceptions caused by mutual ignorance might be avoided".

This coursebook has been available since September 2006 for grade 12 students (Klasse 12/13 in Germany). It is published jointly by Editis in France and Ernst Klett in Germany. A coursebook for grade 11 has also been produced. The set of three coursebooks will cover the period from Antiquity to modern times.

Distribution and reception 
Reviews say it is a symbolic token of Franco-German cooperation. In 2008, two years after its creation, 80,000 coursebooks had been sold in each country. Since inception, several other pairs of countries have discussed the possibility of creating a bi-national coursebook, including Czech Republic—Germany, Poland—Germany and Slovak Republic—Hungary.

Bibliography

German
 S. 25 ff. Eine sehr kritische Besprechung des Teils, der sich mit der Judenverfolgung und Judenvernichtung durch das Vichy-Regime und die Deutschen befasst
 Rezension des Lehrwerks bis ca. 1900, in: ebd., S. 21-24 Beide Art. auch in frz. Sprache erhältlich in der Parallel-Ausgabe Documents. Revue du dialogue franco-allemand Insbes. auch zur sog. Erbfeindschaft.

French
, L’Europe et ses passés douloureux, La Découverte
 Corine Defrance et Ulrich Pfeil, « Le manuel franco-allemand d’histoire : l’aboutissement d’un longue travail de coopération entre historiens français et allemands », dans Claire Demesmay et Hans Stark (dir.), Radioscopies de l’Allemagne 2007, Institut français de relations internationales, coll. « Travaux et recherches de l’IFRI » , Paris, 2007, p. 335–350
 Étienne François, « Le manuel franco-allemand d’histoire : une entreprise inédite », Vingtième Siècle. Revue d'histoire , nº 94, avril 2007
 Hélène Miard-Delacroix, « Une tâche difficile. Le manuel d’histoire franco-allemand », Documents. Revue des questions allemandes , année 2006 nº 3
 Ulrich Pfeil, « Comment s’est construit le manuel franco-allemand ? », in Actes des premières Rencontres internationales sur la mémoire partagée, édité par le ministère de la Défense et le ministère des Anciens Combattants et Victimes de guerre, La Documentation française, coll. « Questions de défense » , Paris, 2007, p. 136-139

See Also
 German-Polish Textbook Commission, a similar project by Poland and Germany

References

External links 
 Histoire / Geschichte French edition
 Histoire / Geschichte German edition

2006 non-fiction books
21st-century history books
History books about Europe
History textbooks
France–Germany relations
History education in France
Historiography of Germany
Historiography of France
Federal Foreign Office